"The Final Curtain" is an episode of the BBC sitcom, The Green Green Grass. It was first screened on 14 December 2007, as the sixth episode of series three.

Synopsis

Boycie uncovers shocking information about his family tree and, with Tyler unexpectedly returning home from university, he is convinced something serious is afoot which could result in an early death. When Dora arrives he is reassured but is even more startled about what he is told.

Episode cast

References

External links
British TV Comedy Guide for The Green Green Grass
BARB viewing figures

2007 British television episodes
The Green Green Grass episodes